This article is about the particular significance of the year 1893 to Wales and its people.

Incumbents

Archdruid of the National Eisteddfod of Wales – Clwydfardd

Lord Lieutenant of Anglesey – Richard Davies 
Lord Lieutenant of Brecknockshire – Joseph Bailey, 1st Baron Glanusk
Lord Lieutenant of Caernarvonshire – John Ernest Greaves
Lord Lieutenant of Cardiganshire – Herbert Davies-Evans
Lord Lieutenant of Carmarthenshire – John Campbell, 2nd Earl Cawdor
Lord Lieutenant of Denbighshire – William Cornwallis-West    
Lord Lieutenant of Flintshire – Hugh Robert Hughes 
Lord Lieutenant of Glamorgan – Robert Windsor-Clive, 1st Earl of Plymouth
Lord Lieutenant of Merionethshire – W. R. M. Wynne 
Lord Lieutenant of Monmouthshire – Henry Somerset, 8th Duke of Beaufort
Lord Lieutenant of Montgomeryshire – Sir Herbert Williams-Wynn, 7th Baronet 
Lord Lieutenant of Pembrokeshire – William Edwardes, 4th Baron Kensington
Lord Lieutenant of Radnorshire – Arthur Walsh, 2nd Baron Ormathwaite

Bishop of Bangor – Daniel Lewis Lloyd   
Bishop of Llandaff – Richard Lewis
Bishop of St Asaph – Alfred George Edwards
Bishop of St Davids – Basil Jones

Events
13 February – The South Wales Daily Post is launched in Swansea.
11 April – In an underground fire at Great Western Mine, Pontypridd, 63 miners are killed.
6 June – Alexandra (Newport and South Wales) Docks and Railway opens South Dock in Newport Docks.
6 July – The future Prince of Wales, Prince George (later George V), marries Mary of Teck; their wedding rings are made of Welsh gold.
7 August – 24 people are drowned at Aberavon when a boat carrying trippers on a Sunday school outing from Ystrad Rhondda capsizes in the bay. A survivor claimed that the inexperienced passengers had been frightened by the waves and all ran to one side of the boat.
September – An International Eisteddfod takes place in Chicago, USA, during the Chicago World's Fair.
17 November – Two boatmen involved in the Aberavon drowning disaster of 7 August are found not guilty of manslaughter by a jury at Cardiff Crown Court.

Arts and literature

Awards
National Eisteddfod of Wales – held at Pontypridd
Chair – John Ceulanydd Williams, "Pulpud Cymru"
Crown – Ben Davies

New books
Charles Ashton – Hanes Llenyddiaeth Gymreig o 1651 hyd 1850
John Gruffydd Moelwyn Hughes – Caniadau Moelwyn
Edwin Cynrig Roberts – Hanes Dechreuad y Wladfa Gymreig
Eleazar Roberts – Owen Rees

Music
Hymnau yr Eglwys (collection of hymns)

Sport
Football – The Welsh Cup is won by Wrexham for the third time in its 14-year history.
Rugby union – Wales wins the Triple Crown for the first time.
Rugby union – Glamorgan Wanderers, Laugharne RFC and Tredegar RFC are established.

Births
15 January – Ivor Novello, composer and actor (died 1951)
27 January – John Russell, VC recipient (died 1917) 
25 February
Billy Jennings, footballer (died 1968) 
Gordon Lang, politician (died 1981)
23 May – Tudor Thomas, pioneering ophthalmic surgeon (died 1976)
24 May – William Hubert Davies, musician (died 1965)
1 June – Lewis Valentine, political activist (died 1986)
2 June – David James Davies, economist, industrialist and writer (died 1956)
1 July – Douglas Marsden-Jones, rugby player (died 1955)
2 July – Ralph Hancock, garden architect (died 1950)
13 July – Evan Morgan, 2nd Viscount Tredegar, poet, occultist and horticulturalist (died 1949)
1 August – Lionel Beaumont Thomas, MC, businessman and politician (died 1942)
15 October – Saunders Lewis, Welsh nationalist poet, dramatist and critic (died 1985)
18 October – Ivor Rees, VC recipient (died 1967)
29 December – Cyril Lakin, politician (died 1948)
31 December – Ossie Male, rugby player (died 1975)
date unknown – Eleanor Evans, actress, singer and theatre director (died 1969)

Deaths
14 January – John Hawley Edwards, footballer, 42
23 January – Dr William Price, eccentric, 92
28 January – David Owen, politician in Wisconsin, 64 
29 January – Griffith Edwards (Gutyn Padarn), poet and antiquary, 80
12 February – Thomas Eyton-Jones, surgeon, physician, magistrate, local politician and army officer, 60
27 March – John Roberts, Sr., billiards champion, 69
30 March – Richard Crawley, writer, 52
24 August – Willie Llewelyn, cricketer, 25 (suicide)
5 September – Morgan Lloyd, politician, 71
17 September – Edwin Cynrig Roberts, Patagonian colonist, about 55
1 October – Samuel Griffith, Pennsylvania politician, 77
23 December – Sir George Elliot, 1st Baronet, MP and founder of the Elliot Home for Seamen in Newport 79

References

Wales